The Ibanez Tube Screamer (TS808/TS9) is a guitar overdrive pedal, made by Ibanez. The pedal has a characteristic mid-boosted tone popular with blues, rock and metal players. The Tube Screamer has been used by many guitarists to create their signature sound, and is one of the most successful, widely copied, and custom-modified ("modded") overdrive pedals in the history of the electric guitar.

Description
The Tube Screamer has a drive knob, a tone knob, and a level knob. The drive knob adjusts gain (which can affect the amount of distortion), the tone knob adjusts treble and the level knob adjusts the output volume of the pedal. The Tube Screamer name refers to the pedal's ability to drive the preamp section of a tube amplifier, resulting in more gain from the amp itself. The pedal also provides a slight boost to mid-range frequencies, helping to reduce muddiness by cutting bass frequencies when used in this way. Some guitarists prefer this sort of equalization, as it helps to keep their sound from getting lost in the overall audio mix of the band. This, along with its versatility as a simple distortion, has made the pedal very popular for a wide variety of styles and situations.

Variations
The pedal was produced with many variants:

The Tube Screamer pedal was preceded by the orange "Overdrive" (OD) and green "Overdrive-II" (OD-II). These came in narrower boxes without battery covers. There was also a reddish "Overdrive-II" which had a housing very similar to the TS-808/TS808. The green OD-II had a circuit similar to the TS808; however, the OD and OD-II had a more distorted circuit.

 TS-808/TS808: The first Tube Screamer, the TS808, was released in the late 1970s. It was equipped with the Japanese JRC-4558 chip. Some units however had the Malaysian-manufactured Texas Instruments RC4558P chip.
 TS9: From 1981 to 1985, Ibanez produced the "9-series" of overdrive pedals. The TS9 Tube Screamer is almost the same internally as the TS808 but the TS9 had a different output, which caused the pedal to sound brighter and less smooth. In later years, TS9s were assembled with a wide variety of op-amps, instead of the sought-after JRC-4558.

Once Ibanez discontinued the 9 series pedals, they introduced the "Master" or "L" series. These were only made in 1985, and did not have the Tube Screamer in the line-up.

A rare and valuable version of the Tube Screamer was the ST9 Super Tube Screamer, which was sold only in Europe and Australia.

 TS10: In 1986, Ibanez began production of the "Power Series", which included the TS10 Tube Screamer. The TS10 had three times as many changes to the circuit than the TS9 had had. Some TS10 pedals were made in Taiwan, using a MC4558 chip. All TS10s (as well as other L and 10-series pedals) used floating jacks and pots, which were mounted to the boards instead of the cases. This is weak point in the design sometimes causing the jacks to break off.
 TS5:  The plastic TS5 "Soundtank" followed the TS10 and was available until 1999. The TS5 circuit is very similar to the TS9; however, it was made for Ibanez in Taiwan by Daphon, although designed by Maxon as referenced by Maxon's history website.  The first year of production had a metal casing; afterwards, the casing was made out of plastic (which resulted in more noise than a typical TS808/TS9 box made out of metal). However, these plastic versions still have a shielded and grounded metal bottom plate for a slight interference reduction plus the needed weight to keep the pedal from sliding because of its light weight.
 TS7:  The TS7 "Tone-Lok" pedal was released in 1999. It was made in Taiwan like the TS5, but in an aluminum case that was more durable. The circuit inside had a "hot" mode switch for extra distortion and volume.  Most TS7 pedals came with the JRC4558D chip, like the TS808 and TS9.
TS808HW: In early 2016, Ibanez revealed the TS808HW. Marketed as a premium, limited edition pedal, TS808HW is hand-wired with select JRC4558D chips and uses high-end OFC cables from Japan. HW is encased in a dark green, heavy duty metal box.  It also comes standard with True Bypass, a feature many had to mod into the circuits of previous Tube Screamers.
 TS-808DX: A combined TS808 equipped with the Japanese JRC-4558 chip with a 20db booster to be used separately or in conjunction with the overdrive.

The TS9 and TS808 pedals have been reissued, and according to the company, feature the same circuitry, electronics and design components that helped shape the famous Tube Screamer sound. Some musicians have a technician perform modifications to the unit to change the sound to their liking. Also, Maxon, which produced the original Tube Screamer pedals for the Ibanez brand in the 1970s–1980s, produce their own version of the Tube Screamer (called Overdrives: the OD-808 and OD-9 as opposed to Tube Screamer, TS).

 TS9B: Released around 2011, it was a bass overdrive pedal designed for bass players, in a dark green stompbox with five knobs : Drive, Mix, Bass, Treble and Level controls. The Mix and 2-band Eq. controls allow bassists to produce the sound they want while still maintaining the feel of the original Tubescreamer and keep their low-end original signal.

Design
In doing so, he used an innovative circuit, using the monolithic operational amplifier device, introduced in early 70s, to create a pedal sound different from the "discrete" transistorized 60's fuzzes.

The overdrive is produced using two silicon diodes in anti-parallel arrangement into the negative feedback circuit of an operational amplifier ("op-amp") circuit, to produce soft, symmetrical distortion of the input waveform. When the output exceeds the forward volt drop of the diodes the amplifier gain is much lower, effectively limiting the output to + and - one diode volt-drop, although due to the exponential I-V curve of the diodes this is not a hard limit. A "drive" potentiomenter in the feedback path provides variable gain. The original 4558 based circuit uses transistor buffers at both the input and the output, to improve impedance matching. This is mathematically equivalent to mixing the input signal with a clipped version of itself, however.  Thought of this way, it is said that this "preserves the original dynamics of the input signal which otherwise would get lost at the threshold of clipping" and "avoids muddiness and vastly improves clarity and responsiveness."

Characteristic of the distortion is the symmetrical nature, which produces mainly odd-order harmonics for a sine wave input. All this justifies the "vacuum tube" sound, and the "screaming" tone. As well, Tamura added a simple but effective post-distortion equalization circuit with a first-order high-pass shelving filter that "is linearly dependent on its gain", an approach called "progressivity". The overdrive stage is followed by a simple low-pass filter and active tone control circuit and volume control, using the second op-amp available on-chip.

The circuit uses transistor buffers at both the input and the output, and a modern electronic field-effect transistor (FET) "noiseless" bypass switching to turn the effect on and off. The TS7 allows switching between a "TS9" mode, in which the circuit and all relevant component values are identical to the vintage model, and a "Hot" mode, which introduces an additional gain stage.  Yet another variant is the Ibanez ST9 Super Tube that features a fourth knob ("Mid Boost"), which provides a harder attack.

JRC4558D op-amp 

Much has been made of the operational amplifier chips used in the various versions of the Tube Screamer pedal, and several "fairy tales" about the merits of these devices have been written on the subject. The JRC4558D chip is well-regarded by some.

The (RC)4558 is a low priced, general purpose dual operational amplifier, introduced mid 70s by Texas Instruments as an "improved" version of the early 741, and used in thousands of consumer and industrial designs. Other popular chips used included the TL072 (a JFET input type, highly popular in 80s), "original" TI RC4558P, and OPA2134. The TA75558 (yet another version, made by Toshiba), standard in the TS10 alongside the 4558, is strangely regarded as the "ugly duckling of TS opamps".

In reality, the type of op-amp has little to do with the sound of the pedal, which is dominated by the diodes in the op-amp's feedback path. (See Op-amp swapping.)

Notable users

The pedal was popularized by Stevie Ray Vaughan and Lee Ritenour. Phish guitarist Trey Anastasio implements two TS9 Tube Screamers in his rig. Gary Moore used the TS9 predominantly for 30 years which was key to his signature lead guitar sound. 

It is widely used in genres as diverse as country, blues and metal. The Tube Screamer has since spawned many clones and modified versions. 
Possible modifications include use of mismatched, or different diodes (for example, a silicon and a germanium device), or more than two diodes in various arrangements, or modified tone circuits. It is also used by many metal guitarists before the lead channel of the high gain amps to make distortion more focused and to cut the low end. Notable modifiers of the pedal include Robert Keeley of Keeley Electronics and Mike Piera of AnalogMan. Joan Jett used a TS9DX model. Arctic Monkeys frontman Alex Turner Also used an Ibanez Tube Screamer for the band’s second Album: Favourite Worst Nightmare

References

External links
 The Technology of the Tube Screamer
 Tube Screamer analysis (with pictures and figures) at ElectroSmash.com

Effects units
Electric guitars